Richard Hugh Robinson (21 June 1926 – 6 August 1970) was a scholar of Buddhism and the founder of the first Buddhist studies program in the United States that awarded a dedicated doctorate degree.

In the 1950s he informally studied Sanskrit with Edward Conze.

He died in 1970 after an accident in his home.

Nearly two years after his death, the journal Philosophy East and West published a memorial tribute to him,  in an issue that also included three of Robinson's previously unpublished papers.

Charles Prebish, in his 1975 edited introductory volume to Buddhism, wrote that in assembling the team of contributors to the volume

Nearly fifty years after his death, in 2019, Robinson was profiled in Tricycle: The Buddhist Review, and described as "the most important scholar of Buddhism you've never heard of".

References

1926 births
1970 deaths
American Buddhists
American Buddhist studies scholars